Radim Valchař (born 20 April 1989) is a Czech -born Romanian professional ice hockey left winger currently playing for ASC Corona Brasov of the Erste Liga.

Career
Valchař began his career with HC Vítkovice and played one game for the team during the 2006–07 Czech Extraliga season. He was then drafted 4th overall of the 2007 CHL Import Draft by the Portland Winterhawks of the Western Hockey League and spent two seasons in Portland before being traded to the Lethbridge Hurricanes in 2009. He played just 13 games for Lethbridge before returning to the Czech Republic with HC Orlová of the Czech 2. Liga.

He then had spells with HC Karviná of the 2. Liga and HC 46 Bardejov of the Slovak 1. Liga before moving to Rapaces de Gap of the French Ligue Magnus on 21 March 2013. On 8 May 2015, Valchař joined Finnish Mestis team Hokki. He played 11 games before returning to France with Boxers de Bordeaux in October of the same year. Valchař then joined Romanian team HSC Csíkszereda in 2016.

Valchař played in the 2009 World Junior Ice Hockey Championships for the Czech Republic.

References

External links

1989 births
Living people
Boxers de Bordeaux players
Czech ice hockey left wingers
HSC Csíkszereda players
Hokki players
Lethbridge Hurricanes players
Sportspeople from Karviná
Portland Winterhawks players
Rapaces de Gap players
HC Vítkovice players
Czech expatriate sportspeople in France
Czech expatriate ice hockey players in Canada
Czech expatriate ice hockey players in the United States
Czech expatriate ice hockey players in Slovakia
Expatriate ice hockey players in France
Expatriate ice hockey players in Romania
Czech expatriate sportspeople in Romania
Czech expatriate ice hockey players in Finland